Bemarivo is the name of several municipalities and rivers in Madagascar;

 Bemarivo, a rural municipality in Melaky.
 Bemarivo Reserve - a protected area in Melaky.
 Bemarivo (Sofia), a river in the Sofia Region.
 Bemarivo River, a river in the Sava Region.
 Bemarivo, Marovoay, a rural municipality in the Sofia Region.
 Bemarivo Ankirondro, a rural municipality in Menabe.